Dilshan de Soysa (born 9 January 1995) is a Sri Lankan cricketer. He made his first-class debut for Sri Lanka Army Sports Club in the 2016–17 Premier League Tournament on 21 December 2016. He made his List A debut for Badulla District in the 2016–17 Districts One Day Tournament on 29 March 2017. He made his Twenty20 debut for Sri Lanka Army Sports Club in the 2017–18 SLC Twenty20 Tournament on 1 March 2018.

References

External links
 

1995 births
Living people
Sri Lankan cricketers
Badulla District cricketers
Sri Lanka Army Sports Club cricketers
People from Southern Province, Sri Lanka